, widely known as Sanwa, is a brand of wireless equipment best known for its high end radio-control gear for scale modelling use. The company have been a subsidiary of the SMC Group since 1965 and began to diversify into the manufacturing of radio-control equipment (transmitters and the devices which they control) in 1974 and remote control devices for home and industrial use since 1985.

In North America, Sanwa transmitters were marketed as Airtronics up until early 2016, which began as an independent company producing model airplanes.

History
Sanwa, originally as part of Sansei Electric Industry, specialized in the research and development of remote control devices in 1959. It merged with Sanwa Denki Manufacturing in 1965 and then became part of the SMC Group. In January 1974, Sanwa entered production and sales of transmitters for radio-controlled models and in December, became a member of the Japan Radio Control Model Industrial Association (JRM).

In 1975, Sanwa became a division on its own, with an office in Tokyo. In August that year it launched its first radio-controlled transmitter, the Mini Propo, and in 1976, Sanwa became an independent company. Its M-sechs wheeled transmitter was the recipient of the Good Design Award in 1990. In 1985, Sanwa diversified into the production of remote controls for domestic and industrial purposes.

Due to its reputation in the radio-controlled modeling industry, its main competitor is Futaba. KO Propo and Spektrum.

Airtronics

F. Lee Renaud began his hobby in model aviation in 1942 with a Joe Ott kit; he began to fly competitively in 1947. While recovering from a heart attack in 1970, Renaud used his medical leave from his office-equipment company job to build radio-controlled airplanes. He formed Airtronics in 1971 to build and sell model airplanes and radio remote-control devices. In his first year, he turned over $40,000. Renaud earned a reputation with model aircraft such as the "Olympic", "Aquila", "Grand Esprit" and "Sagitta", amongst others. In 1980, he introduced the XL transmitter. Renaud died in January 1983, and his wife Barbara took over the company.

In 1982, realizing that his company wouldn't expand on its own without financial backing, Renaud took on a partnership with Sanwa, which bought an undisclosed large stake in the company while the family retained a controlling interest. Under the agreement, the Renauds built airplanes whilst Sanwa took charge of manufacturing radio-controlled transmitters for the Renauds to distribute. As a result, Airtronics increased its sales from less than $1 million in 1983 to $3 million in 1985, and to $8 million in 1989 with a staff of 18 employees.

The company continued as a family business until 2007 when Global Hobby Distributors took over distributorship. Following business restructuring in Japan, the distributor announced that their partnership came to an end in 2016 and the brand will itself be discontinued although still continuing under a new distributor, Serpent America, as Sanwa.

The library of Academy of Model Aeronautics's National Model Aviation Museum is named after Renaud. Sanwa's Aquila 6 is named after his airplane.

Accolades
The Airtronics Caliber 3PS (known internationally as the Sanwa M-zechs) became the first of twelve consecutive Radio Control Car Action's Readers' Choice Award for Best Transmitter in 1996 by Airtronics; eight of those was achieved by its successor, the M8.

IFMAR World Championship winners
Following is a list of users who won the IFMAR World Championships, a biennial world championship for radio-controlled cars, using Sanwa/Airtronics transmitters.

References

External links 
  
 English website 
 Sanwa Electronic in Bloomberg

Electronics companies of Japan
Manufacturing companies of Japan
Radio-controlled transmitter
Remote control
Multinational companies headquartered in Japan
Companies based in Osaka Prefecture
Electronics companies established in 1959
Manufacturing companies established in 1959
1959 establishments in Japan
Japanese brands